Khosrow IV was a Sasanian claimant to the throne who ruled Susa and its surroundings from ca. 630 to 636. Little is known about his rule, he appears to have ruled during a time of upheaval and chaos across the Sasanian Empire the 7th century has the century where Iran has plunged into its "dark ages".

References

Sources
 

7th-century deaths
7th-century Sasanian monarchs
Year of birth unknown